The National Trade Union Confederation – Meridian is the smallest national trade union center in Romania.

References

National trade union centers of Romania